Williamsville East High School is one of the three high schools located in the Williamsville Central School District in Williamsville, New York.  The other two high schools in the district are Williamsville North High School and Williamsville South High School. For the 2016–2017 school year, 1,030 students were enrolled in the school, about the same as the 2004–2005 school year, where 1,048 students were enrolled.

Curriculum
Williamsville East has a wide range of Advanced Placement courses in many areas of study. All students are required to take the New York State Regents exams as required by the state for graduation. Williamsville East offers two different New York State certified diplomas: The Regents diploma and the Advanced Regents Diploma. The Advanced Regents diploma has more requirements in the math and sciences than the Regents diploma. Williamsville East has a Foreign Language requirement, which all students must fulfill by passing the regents exam in that language, usually in the end of their sophomore or junior years.  Advanced Placement, Honors, and Regents courses are available in English, Social Studies, Natural Sciences, Foreign Language, and Mathematics. East offers four foreign languages for study; French, Spanish, Latin, and Mandarin Chinese.

Music
The Rockefeller Philanthropy Advisors donated a $70,000 grant to assist the Williamsville Poetry Music Dance Celebration, begun at Williamsville East in 2000 by band director Dr. Stephen Shewan and English teacher Mr. John Kryder.

Athletics
The Men's Ice Hockey team in 2003 won the school's only State Championship to date against Salmon River. The game was won with an overtime goal at the Utica Auditorium in Utica, NY.

Established in 1990, East's hockey team went on to win their first state championship in 2004 as part of the New York State Public High School Athletic Association League for hockey.

During the 2006 season, the Girls Varsity Soccer Team won the Section VI Class A title, and were ranked as high as 6th nationally.  They have won 3 sectional championships and one Far West Regional Championship.  The undefeated 2009 team was upset in the Regional playoff game.

On November 6, 1985 the men's gymnastics team set the New York State Public High School Athletic Association Men's Gymnastics Team competition record, scoring 158.4 points.  The record stood unbroken for the entirety of New York State high school men's gymnastics history.  In 1985 the Williamsville East Men's Gymnastics also set another record, 99 wins and 0 losses. East was one of four schools left in New York with a men's team. Their team finished its 2014 season with a shared sectional title with Williamsville South High School and a 12–0 record before the sport left all high schools in the state.

The Women's Swim Team has been undefeated and Division II Champions for 8 years in a row.

In the 2010–2011 Season, the Williamsville East Flames Varsity Hockey team was the first team in school history to win the Federation League championship at HSBC Arena, beating Kenmore East 2–1. They went on to win a state regional game against Webster Thomas High school, and continued on to the state final four where they advanced to the State championship by beating Pelham in overtime, but lost 6–2 in the State Championship to Cazenovia.

The first ever Williamsville Women's Varsity Ice Hockey team won the 2010–2011 Inaugural Western New York Women's Ice Hockey Federation Championship over OP/Frontier, 6–0.

Anti-Muslim bullying incident
In March 2016, the school came under fire for a racially charged Islamophobic bullying incident.

Notable alumni

Kazim Ali (1989), poet
Daniel Lewis Foote, diplomat
Seth Godin (1978), New York Times bestselling author, entrepreneur
Todd Marchant, NHL hockey player
Greg Papa (1980), Professional Sportscaster. Indiana Pacers, Golden State Warriors, San Antonio Spurs, Oakland A's, Oakland Raiders
John Stevens IV, a finalist on American Idol in Season 3
Siva Vaidhyanathan (1984), media historian
Joe Mack (2021), Miami Marlins 2021 MLB 1st round Pick 31

References

External links
 WITS
Official website: 

Public high schools in New York (state)
Schools in Erie County, New York